Vortex, The Face of Medusa (translit. To prosopo tis Medousas and also known as Vortex) is a 1967 Greek-British drama film directed by Nikos Koundouros. It was entered into the 17th Berlin International Film Festival. It features a beautiful man-eating woman on a remote Greek island, eating stranded men.

Cast
 Philippo Vlachos as Alexis
 Fanis Hinas as Filippos
 Alexis Mann as Filippos' brother
 Hara Angelousi as Filippos' girlfriend
 George Willing
 Assounda Arka
 Jacqueline Blaire
 Dimitris Coromilas
 Yorgo Voyagis

References

External links

1967 films
1967 drama films
Greek drama films
Greek-language films
Greek black-and-white films
English-language Greek films
Films directed by Nikos Koundouros
1960s English-language films